Lahore Confidential is a 2021 Indian Hindi-language spy thriller film which was premiered on ZEE5 in February 2021. The film is directed by Kunal Kohli. It is created by S. Hussain Zaidi and stars Richa Chadda and Arunoday Singh. The film is about R&AW agents in Lahore investigating Pakistani terrorist group's role in activities related to terror. This movie is a sequel of 2020 film London Confidential, which was premiered in 2020 on ZEE5

Plot 
The Story revolves around a humble Indian woman named Ananya Srivastav (Richa Chadda), who works with RAW. In order to get away from her mundane life, she wanted an overseas assignment from the government. But she finds herself on a secret intelligence duty in Pakistan.

Cast 
 Richa Chadda as Ananya Srivastav
 Karishma Tanna as Yukti
 Arunoday Singh as Rauf Ahmed Kazmi / Wasim Ahmed Khan
 Alka Amin as Mrs. Srivastav, Ananya's mother
 Khalid Siddiqui as RD
 Kanan Arunachalam as Subramaniam
 Abdullah Osman as Pathan
 Fareed Khan as Qadir Bhai

Release
Lahore Confidential was premiered on ZEE5 on 4 February 2021.

Reception
Lahore confidential did not receive a great response. It was regarded as an abject movie with zero thrills. It was also said that director Kunal Kohli had nothing new to offer in this film.

References

External links
 
 Lahore Confidential on ZEE5

2021 films
Indian spy thriller films
2020s Hindi-language films
Films not released in theaters due to the COVID-19 pandemic
Films postponed due to the COVID-19 pandemic
ZEE5 original films
Films about the Research and Analysis Wing